Sentonge (died 1173) was the probably legendary Viscount of Béarn from 1171, until his execution two years later. He was from Auvergne. The story of his succession to Béarn is probably not reliable and is likely a later invention.

In 1171, the nobles of Béarn executed their elected viscount Theobald. They invited Sentonge to take up the vicecomital office. He lasted two years in power until the nobles turned against him for infringing upon the Fors de Bearn. He was arrested and executed to be replaced by Gaston VI.

1173 deaths
Sentonge
Year of birth unknown
12th-century French nobility

References